Robert Benjamin Schmidt (April 22, 1933 – May 2, 2015) was an American professional baseball player, a catcher in Major League Baseball for seven seasons (1958–63; 1965) for the San Francisco Giants, Cincinnati Reds, Washington Senators and New York Yankees.

Major League career
Born in St. Louis, Missouri, Schmidt signed with the New York Giants in 1951, and rose methodically through their minor league system. He missed the 1953 and 1954 seasons due to military service, but when he returned to baseball he was selected all-star catcher in successive years in the Double-A Texas League (1956) and the Triple-A American Association (1957). Concurrently the Giants' catchers of the 1950s, Wes Westrum, Ray Katt and Valmy Thomas, were aging or proving ineffective, and the franchise itself transferred to San Francisco.

As a rookie with the 1958 San Francisco Giants, Schmidt was selected to be on the National League team in the 1958 All-Star Game. On August 31, 1958, Schmidt hit a home run and had six runs batted in against future Baseball Hall of Fame member, Sandy Koufax, of the Los Angeles Dodgers, including a first-inning grand slam.

In 1961, he was traded with  Don Blasingame and Sherman Jones to the Cincinnati Reds for catcher Ed Bailey. Schmidt appeared in 27 games as a reserve to regular catcher Jerry Zimmerman during the Reds' pennant-winning season of 1961, but he batted only .129, spent part of the year at Triple-A, and was not included on the post-season roster when the Reds lost to the 1961 Yankees in the World Series. In 1962 he was traded along with Dave Stenhouse to the Washington Senators for Marty Keough and Johnny Klippstein. Schmidt ended his career with the New York Yankees in 1965.

Career statistics
In a seven-year major league career, Schmidt played in 454 games, accumulating 317 hits in 1,305 at bats for a .243 career batting average along with 39 home runs and 150 runs batted in. Schmidt led the American League in fielding percentage in  while playing for the Senators. He had a career fielding percentage of .988. He holds the Major League record for most putouts in an extra inning game with 22, set on June 22, .

References

External links

 Retrosheet

1933 births
2015 deaths
Baseball players from St. Louis
Cincinnati Reds players
Dallas Eagles players
Danville Leafs players
Indianapolis Indians players
Lenoir Red Sox players
Major League Baseball catchers
New York Yankees players
Oshkosh Giants players
Richmond Virginians (minor league) players
San Francisco Giants players
Toledo Mud Hens players
Washington Senators (1961–1971) players